Thông Nông is a former district of Cao Bằng province in the Northeast region of Vietnam. As of 2003, the district had a population of 23,116. The district covers an area of 360 km². The district capital lies at Thông Nông.

Thông Nông district was subdivided to 11 commune-level subdivisions, including Thông Nông township and the rural communes of: Bình Lãng, Thanh Long, Lương Can, Yên Sơn, Đa Thông, Lương Thông, Vị Quang, Cần Yên, Cần Nông and Ngọc Động.

The district was formed in 1966 from a portion of Hà Quảng district, and was reannexed by Hà Quảng District on January 10, 2020.

References

Former districts of Vietnam